Fritz Nilsen (22 July 1939 – 30 November 2000) was a Norwegian journalist.

He was born in Sandnessjøen, and studied literature at the University of Oslo and the University of Bergen. He was hired in the 1960s as a secretary for the Socialist People's Party parliamentary group. He then worked in the Norwegian News Agency, and in 1971 he was hired in the Norwegian Broadcasting Corporation. He was their correspondent in East Asia, stationed in Singapore from 1979 to 1983. He worked two years in Norway before becoming correspondent in Beijing. He reported from the Tiananmen Square protests of 1989. He was later the Norwegian Broadcasting Corporation's Middle East correspondent from 1994 to 1999. The headquarters were in Cairo and Amman.

At home in Norway, Nilsen also chaired the local trade union branch. He wrote several books, mostly about topics he had researched as a foreign correspondent, but also about socialist politics in Norway. His last book, the travel guide Jerusalem, was released posthumously in 2001. He resided in Nesodden and died in November 2000. Before his death he was considered for the Socialist Left Party ballot in the 2001 Norwegian parliamentary election.

References

1939 births
2000 deaths
People from Alstahaug
People from Nesodden
Socialist Left Party (Norway) politicians
NRK people
Norwegian television reporters and correspondents
Norwegian expatriates in Singapore
Norwegian expatriates in China
Norwegian non-fiction writers
University of Oslo alumni
University of Bergen alumni
20th-century Norwegian writers
20th-century Norwegian journalists